Born into an upper-middle-class family in 1803, Thérèse-Adèle Husson  was a French writer in the post-Revolutionary period.  At the age of nine months, she became blind as a result of smallpox. She wrote more than a dozen children's novels.  She also wrote an autobiography, dictated to two different writers, which was sent to the director of the Quinze-Vingts Hospital in 1825.  This autobiography was later discovered by Zina Weygand in the hospital's archives, and with the assistance of Catherine Kudlick, Weygand translated the work and published it as Reflections: The Life and Writings of a Young Blind Woman in Post-Revolutionary France.  The book is known for being the first French-language book by a blind person about blindness.  Husson died in 1831 following severe burns received when her apartment caught on fire.

External links
NWSA Journal Vol.14, No.3 (Autumn 2002)
British Library Direct: Reading a Life Between the Lines: Therese-Adele Husson's Reflections on Blindness, by G, Kleege
The Holman Society Presents: Selected Reflections on the Physical and Moral Condition of the Blind (1825)

See also
Louis Braille, Braille

French blind people
1803 births
1831 deaths
19th-century French women writers
Literature about blindness
Blind writers